9800 series may refer to:

 Chiba New Town Railway 9800 series, a Japanese train type
 HP 9800 series
 PC-9800 series